Mauricio Bernardo Victorino Dansilo (October 11, 1982 in Montevideo) is a Uruguayan former football defender.

Club career

Nacional
He made his debut for Nacional in a Copa Libertadores match against Argentine River Plate on March 3, 2005. His uncle Waldemar Victorino had also previously played for Nacional.

Veracruz
In August 2006 he was transferred one season to Veracruz where he played in the Mexican Primera División. In July 2007 he returned to Nacional.

Universidad de Chile
On August 1, 2009, he was transferred to Universidad de Chile after an excellent campaign with Nacional in the 2009 Copa Libertadores and the 2008–09. He scored his first goal as a Universidad de Chile player, after a left-footed shot, on August 30, 2009, in a game against Audax Italiano.

Cruzeiro
Victorino joined Brazilian club Cruzeiro on February 1, 2011.

Danubio
After a spending the 18/19 season without a club as a penalty for testing positive to PEDs, it was announced on August 17, 2019 that Victorino had joined hometown club Danubio F.C.

National team
Victorino played on the Uruguay national team in the 2010 FIFA World Cup. In the shoot out against Ghana, he scored the second penalty kick for Uruguay in the World Cup quarterfinals on July 2, 2010. The goal was one of four that sent Uruguay to the semi-finals for the first time in 40 years.

In 2011, he won the Copa América playing 2 matches.

In 2016, he returned to the national team, after an absence of more than three years.

Honors

Club
Nacional
Primera División Uruguaya: 2005, 2005–06, 2008–09

Universidad de Chile
Primera División de Chile (1): 2011 Apertura

Cruzeiro
Campeonato Mineiro: 2011
Campeonato Brasileiro Série A: 2013

International
Uruguay
Copa América: 2011

References

External links

1982 births
Living people
Uruguayan footballers
Uruguayan expatriate footballers
Uruguay international footballers
Club Nacional de Football players
Plaza Colonia players
Club Atlético Independiente footballers
C.D. Veracruz footballers
Universidad de Chile footballers
Cruzeiro Esporte Clube players
Sociedade Esportiva Palmeiras players
Cerro Porteño players
Danubio F.C. players
Uruguayan Primera División players
Liga MX players
Chilean Primera División players
Argentine Primera División players
Campeonato Brasileiro Série A players
Paraguayan Primera División players
Association football defenders
2010 FIFA World Cup players
2011 Copa América players
Copa América Centenario players
Footballers from Montevideo
Copa América-winning players
Doping cases in association football
Uruguayan expatriate sportspeople in Argentina
Uruguayan expatriate sportspeople in Brazil
Uruguayan expatriate sportspeople in Chile
Uruguayan expatriate sportspeople in Mexico
Uruguayan expatriate sportspeople in Paraguay
Expatriate footballers in Argentina
Expatriate footballers in Brazil
Expatriate footballers in Chile
Expatriate footballers in Mexico
Expatriate footballers in Paraguay